Tobi 29 - Coptic Calendar - Meshir 1 

The thirtieth day of the Coptic month of Tobi, the fifth month of the Coptic year. On a common year, this day corresponds to January 25, of the Julian Calendar, and February 7, of the Gregorian Calendar. This day falls in the Coptic Season of Shemu, the season of the Harvest.

Commemorations

Martyrs 

 The martyrdom of the Virginal Saints Pistis, Helpis, Agape, and their mother Saint Sophia

Saints 

 The departure of Pope Mina I, the 47th Patriarch of the See of Saint Mark 
 The departure of Saint Ibrahim el-Rahawy, the Hermit

References 

Days of the Coptic calendar